The 1967 USA Outdoor Track and Field Championships men's competition took place between June 26-28 at Memorial Stadium on the campus of Bakersfield College in Bakersfield, California. The women's division held their championships a little over a week later, separately, eighty miles southwest at La Playa Stadium on the campus of Santa Barbara City College, California.  Both tracks were dirt tracks, technically a finely crushed brick surface.

This is the meet where Jim Ryun set the world record in the mile, uncharacteristically leading from the gun in 3:51.1, which lasted for almost eight years.  Paul Wilson also set the world record in the pole vault, that lasted over a year until runner-up Bob Seagren beat it, at altitude, at the 1968 Olympic Trials.

In Santa Barbara, Barbara Ferrell also equalled the world record in the 100 meters at 11.1 (+0.3).  Her record would last until Wyomia Tyus broke it in the Olympic final, at altitude, in Mexico City.

Results

Men track events

Men field events

Women track events

Women field events

See also
United States Olympic Trials (track and field)

References

 Results from T&FN
 results

USA Outdoor Track and Field Championships
Usa Outdoor Track And Field Championships, 1967
Track and field
Track and field in California
USA Outdoor Track and Field Championships
USA Outdoor Track and Field Championships
Sports competitions in California